Langkasuka  was an ancient Malay Hindu-Buddhist kingdom located in the Malay Peninsula. The name is Sanskrit in origin; it is thought to be a combination of  langkha  for "resplendent land" -sukkha for "bliss".  The kingdom, along with Old Kedah, is among the earliest kingdoms founded on the Malay Peninsula.  The exact location of the kingdom is of some debate, but archaeological discoveries at Yarang near Pattani, Thailand suggest a probable location. The kingdom is proposed to have been established in the 1st century, perhaps between 80 and 100 AD.

According to the legend given in the Kedah Annals, the kingdom was founded and named by Merong Mahawangsa.  Another proposal suggests that the name may have been derived from langkha and Ashoka, the legendary Mauryan Hindu warrior king who eventually became a pacifist after embracing the ideals espoused in Buddhism, and that the early Indian colonizers of the Malay Isthmus named the kingdom Langkasuka in his honour.  Chinese historical sources provided some information on the kingdom and recorded a king Bhagadatta who sent envoys to the Chinese court.

Historical records 
The earliest and most detailed description of the kingdom comes from the Chinese Liang Dynasty (502-557) record Liangshu, which refers to the kingdom of "Lang-ya-xiu" (Lang-gga-siu in Hokkien). The record mentions that the kingdom was founded over 400 years earlier, which made its founding likely some time in the late 1st or early 2nd century. According to Liangshu, "Lang-ya-xiu" or Langkasuka was thirty days' journey from east to west, and twenty from north to south, 24,000 li in distance from Guangzhou.  It mentions that Aloeswood (Aquilaria) and camphor were abundant in the kingdom, and its capital was described as being surrounded by walls to form a city with double gates, towers and pavilions.  Both men and women in Langkasuka wore sarongs with their torsos bare and their hair loose, although the king and senior officials covered their shoulders with cloth and wore gold earrings and belts of gold cord.  Women of high status wrapped themselves in cloth and wore jeweled girdles. It gives further information on some of its kings and also relates a story on a succession:

This king then ruled for more than 20 years. He was succeeded by his son, King Bhagadatta, who sent the first ambassadorial mission to China in 515. Further emissaries were sent in 523, 531, and 568.
  
The transcription of the kingdom's name in Chinese records changed over time.  In the late seventh century, the Buddhist monk Yi Jing mentioned encountering three Chinese monks who lived in a place named Lang-jia-shu (郎伽戍).

A Song Dynasty work Zhu fan zhi (published in 1225) gives a description of the country of Ling-ya-si-jia (凌牙斯加).  It mentions that its people cut their hair and wrapped themselves in a piece of cloth, its products included elephant tusks, rhinoceros horns, types of wood and camphor, and their merchants traded in wine, rice, silk and porcelain. It also says that the country paid tribute to a country named Sanfoqi, which is usually interpreted to be Srivijaya.

Langkasuka was known as "Long-ya-xi-jiao" (龍牙犀角) in Daoyi Zhilüe from the Yuan Dynasty (1279–1368); and "Lang-xi-jia" (狼西加) during the Ming Dynasty (1368–1644), as marked in the Mao Kun map of Admiral Zheng He . Daoyi Zhilüe mentions that the native of Langkasuka make salt from seawater and ferment rice wine, and produced hornbill casques, lakawood, honey and gharuwood. The people wore cotton from the Philippines and printed cloth from India and local sources.

"Langkasuka" was mentioned in the Malay text Hikayat Merong Mahawangsa, and it was referred to as "Lengkasuka" in the Javanese poem Nagarakretagama. Tamil sources name "Ilangasoka" as one of Rajendra Chola's conquests in his expedition against the Srivijaya empire. It was described as a kingdom that was "undaunted in fierce battles".  Thai sources made no reference to Langkasuka, but Pattani was identified as one of the twelve Naksat cities  under the influence of Nakhon Si Thammarat in Thai chronicles.

Outline of Langkasuka's history
A brief outline of the history of Langkasuka can be determined from the limited historical records available.  The kingdom is thought to have been founded some time early in the 2nd century AD.  It then underwent a period of decline due to the expansion of Funan in the early 3rd century. In the 6th century it experienced a resurgence and began to send emissaries to China. King Bhagadatta first established relations with China in 515 AD, with further embassies sent in 523, 531 and 568.  By the 8th century it had probably come under the control of the rising Srivijaya empire.  In 1025 it was attacked by the armies of King Rajendra Chola in his campaign against Srivijaya. In the 12th century Langkasuka was a tributary to Srivijaya. The kingdom declined and how it ended is unknown. Around the 15th century the Pattani Kingdom was established nearby.

Location

Chinese and Arab sources placed the ancient kingdom on the east coast of the Malay Peninsula.  The New Book of Tang mentioned that Langkasuka bordered on Pan Pan, and a map in the Ming Dynasty military treatise Wubei Zhi locates it south of Songkla near Pattani River.  A 15th century Arab text similarly places the kingdom south of Songkla.  The only contradictory information comes from a later Malay text Hikayat Marong Mahawangsa which placed it on the west coast as the predecessor of modern Kedah, although its sovereign had some association with Pattani.  Chinese, Arab and Indian sources all considered Kedah and Langkasuka to be separate geographical entities. The Javanese poem Nagarakretagama placed it north of Saiburi, however it appears to imply that it was originally located on the west coast but was transferred later to the east.

In 1961, taking account of the various sources, the geographer and historian Paul Wheatley concluded that Langkasuka should be located near to the modern town of Pattani. French archaeologist and historian Michel Jacq-Hergoualc'h concurred, and proposed the former estuary of the Pattani River near Yarang as the likely location of Langkasuka.  He also suggested that whole area between Pattani, Saiburi and Yala may be part of Langkasuka. Modern archaeological explorations have uncovered ruins near Yarang, a village fifteen kilometers south of Pattani, which may be of the city described in Liangshu.  The city was located inland 10 miles from the coast and connected to the rivers leading to the sea via canals.  Silting of the waterways may have led to its decline.

Archaeology

Several archaeological expeditions were conducted in the 1960s to locate Langkasuka following the suggestion by Paul Wheatley of its likely location. In 1963, Stewart Wavell led a Cambridge expedition to locate Langkasuka and Tambralinga and the details of this expedition are described in The Naga King's Daughter.

An archaeological investigation of the Yarang area began in 1989 by the Fine Arts Department of Thailand. The majority the ruins were clustered in the vicinity of a hamlet called Ban Wat, and may have formed the nucleus of the city.  Others were scattered further to the North at Ban Jalæ, and a couple more at Ban Prawæ. The excavations found various Buddhist structures and objects including votice tablets and sculptures, indicating a strong Buddhist presence  in the kingdom.  Objects related to Hindu worship were also found.

Many Chinese and Arab coins made of bronze have been found in the region, an indication of the commercial activity of the kingdom.  Two silver Sassanid coins have also been found.

Langkasuka in popular culture 
The kingdom has been made as either a subject or setting of several films:
 Raja Bersiong (or The Fanged King), a 1968 Malaysian film directed by Jamil Sulong with input from Malaysia's Prime Minister Tunku Abdul Rahman.
 Queen of Pattani or Queens of Langkasuka, a 2008 Thai movie directed by Nonzee Nimibutr loosely based on a south Pattani myth.
 The Malay Chronicles: Bloodlines (also known by its local title Hikayat Merong Mahawangsa), a 2011 Malaysian film directed by Yusry Abdul Halim. The film is loosely based on the origins of Merong Mahawangsa, said to be the first King of Langkasuka.

See also 

 Kota Gelanggi
 Bujang Valley
 Gangga Negara
 Nakhon Sri Thammarat
 Naksat cities

References

External links 
 A History of the Malay Peninsula: Langkasuka

Pre-Muslim kingdoms in Malaysian history
Medieval Hindu kingdoms
Former countries in Malaysian history
Indianized kingdoms
Former countries in Thai history
2nd-century establishments
15th-century disestablishments in Asia
History of Patani
Historical regions
Malay Peninsula
Southern Thailand